Robert Bowyer II (by 1529 – 1567/68), of the Middle Temple, London and Chichester, Sussex, was an English politician.

Career
He was a Member of Parliament (MP) for Chichester in 1555 and 1559.

References

1568 deaths
Year of birth uncertain
People from Chichester
English MPs 1555
English MPs 1559